In geometry, the order-5 apeirogonal tiling is a regular tiling of the hyperbolic plane. It has Schläfli symbol of {∞,5}.

Symmetry
The dual to this tiling represents the fundamental domains of [∞,5*] symmetry, orbifold notation *∞∞∞∞∞ symmetry, a pentagonal domain with five ideal vertices. 
 

The order-5 apeirogonal tiling can be uniformly colored with 5 colored apeirogons around each vertex, and coxeter diagram: , except ultraparallel branches on the diagonals.

Related polyhedra and tiling 

This tiling is also topologically related as a part of sequence of regular polyhedra and tilings with five faces per vertex, starting with the icosahedron, with Schläfli symbol {n,5}, and Coxeter diagram , with n progressing to infinity.

See also

Tilings of regular polygons
List of uniform planar tilings
List of regular polytopes

References
 John H. Conway, Heidi Burgiel, Chaim Goodman-Strass, The Symmetries of Things 2008,  (Chapter 19, The Hyperbolic Archimedean Tessellations)

External links 

 Hyperbolic and Spherical Tiling Gallery
 KaleidoTile 3: Educational software to create spherical, planar and hyperbolic tilings
 Hyperbolic Planar Tessellations, Don Hatch

Apeirogonal tilings
Hyperbolic tilings
Isogonal tilings
Isohedral tilings
Order-5 tilings
Regular tilings